Anguksa (안국사, 安國祠) is a shrine located in Nakseongdae Park, Seoul, South Korea. It was built in 1973–74 to commemorate General Gang Gam-chan (948–1031). A memorial ceremony is held at the shrine every October to commemorate the general.

Contents of the shrine

The shrine itself was built in a style like that seen in the Goryeo period. It has high ceilings, and houses various portraits of General Gang.

Situated by the shrine is a Three Storied Stone Pagoda (designation Seoul Tangible Cultural Property No. 4) of the Goryeo dynasty, also erected to commemorate General Gang at the place of his birth, Nakseongdae. Nakseongdae (낙성대, 落星垈)  literally means “place where a star has fallen,” and refers to the legend that a star fell from the sky when General Gang was born.  The pagoda was moved from the original site of Gang’s birth (Nakseongdae Yuji, 낙성대유지), and relocated to the Nakseongdae Park area in 1973.

In front of the shrine is a large statue of General Gang on horseback.

Location

Anguksa shrine at Nakseongdae Park can be visited by taking the Green 02 bus from Nakseongdae Station on Subway Line 2.

Gallery

See also
 Gang Gam-chan
 Nakseongdae

Citations

Buildings and structures in Seoul
Buildings and structures completed in 1974